La'Tasha Mayes is an American activist and politician who is a member of the Pennsylvania House of Representatives. A member of the Democratic Party, she represents the 24th district, which contains parts of Pittsburgh.

Early life and education 
Mayes was born and raised in West Philadelphia, Pennsylvania. She graduated from the University of Pittsburgh in 2003 with a Bachelor of Science degree in business administration. She then attended Heinz College at Carnegie Mellon University, where she graduated with a Master of Science degree in public policy and management in 2005.

Early career 
Mayes is an activist and community organizer for reproductive justice. In 2004, Mayes co-founded New Voices for Reproductive Justice, an intersectional advocacy group emphasizing the reproductive health and well-being of Black women and LGBT people in Pennsylvania and Ohio, and served as its president and executive director until 2022. The organization won a lawsuit in 2015 which compelled the Pennsylvania Department of Human Services to expand Medicaid coverage for 74,415 low-income women in Pennsylvania. In 2022, deeming the result of the gubernatorial election critical to protecting abortion rights in Pennsylvania, the group endorsed and helped to organize voters for Democratic nominee Josh Shapiro.

In 2008, New Voices for Reproductive Justice was among the leading groups to lobby for the creation of human relations commissions at the county and state levels to enforce statutes of non-discrimination on the basis of gender identity and sexual orientation. When Allegheny County enacted such legislation and created such a commission in 2009, Mayes was appointed to be vice chair of the Allegheny County Human Relations Commission. In 2022, Mayes identified the strengthening of the provisions of the Pennsylvania Human Relations Act to a full LGBT non-discrimination ordinance as a campaign priority in her run for the Pennsylvania House of Representatives.

In 2015, Mayes ran for the Pittsburgh City Council in the 7th district, losing the Democratic primary to incumbent Deborah Gross.

Pennsylvania House of Representatives

Elections

2022 
On January 19, 2022, Mayes announced that she would run for the Pennsylvania House of Representatives from the 24th district, which contains parts of Pittsburgh. The seat was vacated midway through the term by Rep. Ed Gainey, who had been elected mayor of Pittsburgh in 2021. In the special election to succeed him, the Democratic nominee was chosen on February 5 by a vote of local party committee members; Martell Covington, a former legislative aide to state senator Jay Costa, won a plurality of the committee vote and was thus nominated, while Mayes placed second out of six candidates. Covington won the special election on April 5 and was seated on April 26.

Subsequently, Mayes ran again for the seat in the regular Democratic primary on May 17 for the full term that would begin in 2023. In her announcement, she said that she was motivated to run to improve community health in the district, with a particular focus on addressing inequities in healthcare that were exacerbated by the COVID-19 pandemic. Mayes also asserted that her extensive experience in the field of reproductive justice was relevant in an atmosphere of political threats to abortion access and comprehensive maternal healthcare, arguing that she would be the strongest candidate to protect abortion rights in Pennsylvania if Roe v. Wade would be overturned (which indeed occurred in June 2022 in the U.S. Supreme Court decision Dobbs v. Jackson Women's Health Organization).

In the Democratic primary, Mayes defeated incumbent Rep. Covington by a margin of 46% to 38%, while a third candidate, Randall Taylor, garnered 16%. Political observers noted that Mayes won despite Covington again receiving the endorsement of the county Democratic committee, and drew comparisons to Jessica Benham and Summer Lee, two other progressive insurgent candidates who won their elections without the county party endorsement.

Mayes won the general election unopposed on November 8.

Committee assignments

Tenure 
Upon taking office, Mayes will become the first lesbian state legislator in the history of Pennsylvania.

Personal life 
Mayes resides in the Morningside neighborhood of Pittsburgh. She identifies as lesbian.

Electoral history 

| colspan="6" style="text-align:center;background-color: #e9e9e9;"| Democratic primary election

| colspan="6" style="text-align:center;background-color: #e9e9e9;"| General election

| colspan="6" style="text-align:center;background-color: #e9e9e9;"| Democratic committee vote

| colspan="6" style="text-align:center;background-color: #e9e9e9;"| General election

| colspan="6" style="text-align:center;background-color: #e9e9e9;"| Democratic primary election

| colspan="6" style="text-align:center;background-color: #e9e9e9;"| General election

References

External links 
[TBD House website]
House Democratic caucus profile
Campaign website

Living people
21st-century African-American politicians
21st-century African-American women
21st-century American politicians
21st-century American women politicians
Activists from Pennsylvania
African-American state legislators in Pennsylvania
African-American women in politics
American abortion-rights activists
Democratic Party members of the Pennsylvania House of Representatives
Heinz College of Information Systems and Public Policy alumni
Lesbian politicians
LGBT African Americans
LGBT people from Pennsylvania
LGBT state legislators in Pennsylvania
Politicians from Philadelphia
Politicians from Pittsburgh
Reproductive rights activists
University of Pittsburgh alumni
Women state legislators in Pennsylvania
Year of birth missing (living people)